Thermoniphas leucocyanea is a butterfly in the family Lycaenidae. It is found in Cameroon and Gabon.

References

Butterflies described in 1961
Thermoniphas